Baqeleh-ye Sofla (also Romanized as Bāqeleh-ye Soflá; also known as Bāgheleh-ye Pā’īn, Baghla Pain, Bāghleh, Bāghleh-ye Pā’īn, Bāghleh-ye Soflá, and Bāqeleh-ye Pā’īn) is a village in Kivanat Rural District, Kolyai District, Sonqor County, Kermanshah Province, Iran. At the 2006 census, its population was 91, in 23 families.

References 

Populated places in Sonqor County